All 18 UCI ProTeams are invited automatically and obligated to attend, with nine cyclists per team.

The cyclists will wear numbers from 1 to 219; the first team is to have numbers 1 to 9, the second team 11 to 19, etc. The exception to this rule will be the  team, who will use numbers 100 to 107 and 109. 108 has been withdrawn by the organisers in memory of Wouter Weylandt who was wearing 108 when he suffered a fatal accident in the 2011 race.

By rider 

Source:

By nationality

References

External links 

Official Site
cyclingnews.com

2012 Giro d'Italia
2012